Astrith Baltsan is an Israeli concert pianist and musicologist, known for her Beethoven interpretation and her unique concert style reaching out for larger audiences worldwide.

Biography

Family
Baltsan was born in Tel Aviv in 1956. Her mother, Dr. Rozelia Ruth Garti (1925–1999) was a pediatrician who came to Israel from Sofia, Bulgaria, in 1949. Her father Hayim Baltsan (1910–2002), a journalist and author, was the founder of ITIM (news agency) news agency and author of the Webster's New World Hebrew Dictionary.

Education
Baltsan began studying music at the age of 8. She won the America Israel Cultural Foundation scholarship and graduated with honors from Tel Aviv University with both BA and MA in piano and musicology (with Mindru Katz and Arie Vardi). She won a scholarship for graduate studies at the Juilliard School in New York, and in 1983 she graduated as a Doctor of Musical Arts (summa cum laude) in piano from the Manhattan School of Music in New York (with Artur Balsam).

Career and awards
Baltsan won her first award in the 1984 Banff Concerto Competition in Canada. In 1984, Baltsan became a laureate of the Concert Artists Guild's competition NYC 1984. She performed at the Norfolk festival of Yale University, the Tanglewood Festival, the La Gesse Festival in France, the Tutzing Festival in Munich and the Ernen Chamber Festival in Switzerland.

Astrith Baltsan returned to Israel in 1985 to join the faculty of the Rubin Academy of Music at Tel Aviv University. She was a founder and music director of the Musica Nova Ensemble for new music, and recorded many original Israeli compositions dedicated especially to her. She performed as pianist, editor and music director of concert series with the Israel Chamber Orchestra (1988–1996), the Israel Philharmonic Orchestra (2000–2019), The Israel Festival in Jerusalem (including performances of all Beethoven Sonatas in 1987) and the New Israeli Opera.

In 1990 Baltsan started to develop her series "Classics in Personal View", in which she performs classical music masterpieces accompanied with live storytelling and explanations. The program also incorporates pop, jazz and other genre segments, and includes performances by guest artists. This series of concerts has been the largest of its type in Israel for the last 30 years.

In 1996 Baltsan and her husband, Israeli composer Moshe Zorman, founded "Music Cathedra", a music college in the Enav cultural center in Tel Aviv. Music Cathedra is a recognized institute of professional development by the Israeli Ministry of Education.

In 2000 Baltsan started collaborating with the Israel Philharmonic Orchestra conducted by Zubin Mehta, a collaboration which continued from 2000 to 2019 including symphonic and chamber music projects and a TV series of youth concerts broadcast on Israel Channel 1, 2003–2004.

Baltsan tours by herself and also as a soloist with an orchestra in Europe, the US, Canada, Central America, Australia and South Africa. Her concerts are broadcast regularly on Kan Kol Hamusica, Israel classical channel. Baltsan and Moshe Zorman have three children: Itamar, Alma and Reut. Her son, violinist Itamar Zorman was the winner of the Tchaikovsky competition in 2011.

Awards
 1984—first prize at Banff Concerto Competition
 1984—The Concert Artist Guild Award, NYC
 2001—Rosenblum Prize for the Performing Arts
 2006—Audience's Favorite prize held by Yediot Ahronot
 2007—Minister of Culture Prize for Music Performers
 2008—Landau Prize held by Mifal HaPayis

References

External links
 A Gigantic Success Story, Herald Tribune International Magazine, 1998 (second link)
 Astrith Baltsan on the Israel Philharmonic Orchestra site, 2000
 Astrith Baltsan with the Israeli Philharmonic, 2001
 Astrith Baltsan on PBS, 2001
 PSANTERIN 9 CD of Israeli music anthology, 2003
 Profile of Astrith Baltsan—a doctoral dissertation in musicology, Dr. Aviva Stanistlavsky, Hebrew University of Jerusalem, 2004
 Baltsan - an incomparable phenomenon, Jewish encyclopedia, 2009
 Article about Baltsan Hatikvah study and show, The Jerusalem Post, April 16, 2010
 CultureBuzz converses with Astrith Baltsan - Israel's Anthem: "HaTikvah", 2012
 Baltsan Hatikvah Gala, LA, 2012
 Baltsan Hatikvah research, The Jerusalem Post, August 8, 2012
 Pianist Explores Hatikvah Origins, Toronto, 2012
 Astrith Baltsan on Israeli TV channel 1, 2012
 Baltsan's Hatikvah on 92nd st Y NYC, 2013
 Eine Geschichte der Hoffnung wie Konzertpianistin Astrith Baltsan  Jüdische Allgemeine on Baltsan's Hatikvah Germany tour, 2013
 Musician and Magician Baltsan, The Jerusalem Post, May 5, 2016
 Baltsan, "Hatikvah Project", Jerusalem Post, April 12, 2018
 Baltsan French Tour, French TV, October 7, 2019 
 Official site of Astrith Baltsan and the Hatikvah show

Israeli pianists
Israeli women pianists
Musicians from Tel Aviv
Israeli twins
Jewish Israeli musicians
Living people
21st-century pianists
1956 births
Jewish women musicians
Women classical pianists
21st-century women pianists
Women musicologists
Israeli musicologists
Jewish musicologists